The South African Railways Class 14C 4-8-2 of 1918 was a steam locomotive.

In 1918 and 1919, the South African Railways placed the first batch of twenty  steam locomotives with a 4-8-2 Mountain type wheel arrangement in service. Three more batches were acquired between 1919 and 1922, each with a different maximum axle loading, to bring the total in the class to 73. Through reboilerings, rebalancings and cylinder bushings during its service life, this single class eventually ended up as six distinct locomotive classes with two boiler types and a multitude of axle load and boiler pressure configurations.

Manufacturer
As a result of wartime disruption in Europe and Britain, the fourth version of the Class 14 locomotive was ordered from the Montreal Locomotive Works (MLW) in Canada in 1918. It was designated Class 14C and the first batch of twenty was delivered in 1918 and early in 1919, numbered in the range from 1761 to 1780.

Until 1922, three more batches of Class 14C would follow from the same manufacturer. All four batches differed in terms of maximum axle loading, adhesive weight and engine weight.

Characteristics
While these locomotives were built to the specifications of D.A. Hendrie, at the time the Chief Mechanical Engineer (CME) of the South African Railways (SAR), they were designed by the Canadian manufacturer and the result was a locomotive with some typical North American characteristics. They had large cabs, bar frames, Walschaerts valve gear, Belpaire fireboxes and were superheated.

A prominent distinction from the earlier Classes 14, 14A and 14B locomotives was their American style high running boards. It had an even better cylinder design than the Class 14, with larger and straighter ports which resulted in a very sharp, free exhaust.

Modifications and reclassifications
The Class 14C proved to be good locomotives, even though they initially suffered from some rather bad teething troubles. Once these were rectified, they went on to become fine performers which were associated with hard work all through their service lives.

During 1920, most of the fireboxes on the early orders of the Class 14C were restayed. The reversing gear was of the single cylinder type and tended to creep. Hendrie therefore fitted oil cylinders and installed his Hendrie reversing gear, which was manufactured in the Pretoria workshops during 1922. Modifications were also made to the finger bars and rocking grate cylinders of the firebox and to the sanding gear. Approximately  of lead were run into the smokebox saddle casting to provide additional weight on the leading bogie.

Watson Standard boilers
During the 1930s, many serving locomotives were reboilered with a standard boiler type designed by A.G. Watson, CME of the SAR at the time, as part of his standardisation policy. Such Watson Standard reboilered locomotives were reclassified by adding an "R" suffix to their classification.

Only slight alterations were necessary to the engine frames. The only other engine on which reboilering resulted in the exceeding of the height restriction was the Class 15BR.

The reboilered engines were also equipped with Watson cabs with their distinctive slanted fronts, compared to the conventional vertical fronts of their original cabs. Early conversions were equipped with copper and later conversions with steel fireboxes. Three of them, numbers 1762 to 1764, would not undergo further modifications and would retain the Class 14CR designation.

Their original Belpaire boilers were fitted with Ramsbottom safety valves, while the Watson Standard boiler was fitted with Pop safety valves. An obvious difference between an original and a Watson Standard reboilered locomotive is usually a rectangular regulator cover, just to the rear of the chimney on the reboilered locomotive. In the case of the Class 14C, two even more obvious differences were the Watson cab and the absence of the Belpaire firebox hump between the cab and boiler on the reboilered locomotives.

Rebalancing
Around 1930, the question of maximum axle loads for locomotives was thoroughly investigated by the Mechanical and Civil Engineering Departments of the SAR. It was found that, among some other locomotives, the Class 14C had a rather severe vertical hammer blow effect on the track when running at speed due to an undue proportion of the reciprocating parts being balanced. Modifications were accordingly made to the Class 14C to allow some of them to run on  track.

The locomotives had weights attached between the frames to increase adhesion. Over time, most of the Class 14C family of locomotives were "rebalanced" by having these weights increased or reduced to redistribute, increase or reduce the axle loading and adhesive weight by altering the loads on the individual coupled wheels, leading bogies and trailing pony trucks. Coupled wheel axle loading adjustment was achieved by attaching steel boxes, filled with an appropriate amount of lead, over each axle between the frames.

The lighter version of the rebalanced locomotives was reclassified to Class 14CB, with the "B" indicating branch line service. Those which had also been reboilered with Watson Standard no. 2 boilers were reclassified to Class 14CRB.

Cylinder bushing
Several of the locomotives had their cylinders bushed to reduce the bore from the as-built .

Service

South African Railways
The Class 14C was placed in service on the Cape Eastern system, working the Umtata branch into Transkei and on the mainline to Cookhouse. Some went to the Cape Western system, where they banked up the Hex River Pass from De Doorns and later worked with Class 19C locomotives across Sir Lowry's Pass to Caledon and Bredasdorp in the Overberg. A few were also used on the Cape Midland system, in Natal and the Eastern Transvaal.

In their later years, many of these locomotives remained on the Cape Western system, most being shedded at Paardeneiland in Cape Town and at Beaufort West, and one at De Aar, where they were mostly used as shunting engines and on short local pick-ups. A large number were also used on the Cape Eastern system, shedded at East London and used as shunting engines, on local pick-ups and also in suburban service. A few also served their last years in the Eastern Transvaal, shedded at Pietersburg and Witbank.

Other operators
Between 1918 and 1921, the Rhodesia Railways (RR) purchased a slightly lighter version of the original Class 14C from MLW. These were designated the RR Class 11. A further batch was built in 1948 and designated RR Class 11A. Some of the RR Class 11s and all the RR Class 11As were eventually sold to Caminhos de Ferro de Moçambique (CFM) and were utilised on the line between Mozambique and Swaziland (since 2018 renamed to Eswatini).

Works numbers
The table lists their years built, manufacturer's works numbers, engine numbers and eventual classifications.

Preservation

Illustration

References

1770
1770
4-8-2 locomotives
2D1 locomotives
MLW locomotives
Cape gauge railway locomotives
Railway locomotives introduced in 1918
1918 in South Africa